Greetings From... is the first live album by American heavy metal band The Sword. Recorded at various dates between September and October 2016 during a North American tour supporting Swedish band Opeth, it was released on May 5, 2017 by Razor & Tie. The album was produced and mixed by the band's bassist Bryan Richie, who had previously produced the compilation album Low Country. The recording of "Maiden, Mother & Crone" was released as the only single from the album.

Background
Greetings From... was recorded during The Sword's fall 2016 tour of the United States supporting Swedish band Opeth. The album's release was supported by two tours of the United States – one in May supporting Clutch and Lucero, as well as a number of headline dates, and the second in June with support on all dates from Big Jesus. The album features recordings of nine tracks on the tour, including four tracks from 2015's High Country, two tracks from 2010's Warp Riders, one track each from 2008's Gods of the Earth and 2006's Age of Winters, and "John the Revelator", which the band released as a single in 2016.

Track listing

Personnel
The Sword
John D. Cronise – vocals, guitar
Kyle Shutt – guitar
Bryan Richie – bass, production, mixing
Santiago "Jimmy" Vela III – drums
Additional personnel
Brendan Burke – engineering
Dan Coutant – mastering
Fiaz Farrelly – photography
Cosimo Galluzzi – cover artwork

Chart positions

References

External links

2017 live albums
The Sword albums
Razor & Tie albums